Oak Glen High School is a public high school near New Cumberland, West Virginia, United States.  It is one of two high schools in the Hancock County School District, serving the northern part of the county including the communities of Chester, Newell, and New Manchester. Athletic teams compete as the Oak Glen Golden Bears in the West Virginia Secondary School Activities Commission  as a member of the Ohio Valley Athletic Conference.

Notable alumni
 Daniel Johnston – Musician, subject of the 2006 documentary The Devil and Daniel Johnston and has performed on the live music television show Austin City Limits.  His songs have been recorded by artists such as Tom Waits, Beck, TV on the Radio, Jad Fair, Eels, Bright Eyes, Calvin Johnson, Death Cab for Cutie, Sparklehorse, Mercury Rev, The Flaming Lips, and Karen O.
 Joaquin Wilde – WWE Superstar
 Peyton Hall - All-American collegiate wrestler at West Virginia University.

References

Educational institutions in the United States with year of establishment missing
Public high schools in West Virginia
Schools in Hancock County, West Virginia
1963 establishments in West Virginia